The scalp is the anatomical area bordered by the human face at the front, and by the neck at the sides and back.

Structure

The scalp is usually described as having five layers, which can conveniently be remembered as a mnemonic:
 S: The skin on the head from which head hair grows. It contains numerous sebaceous glands and hair follicles.
 C: Connective tissue. A dense subcutaneous layer of fat and fibrous tissue that lies beneath the skin, containing the nerves and vessels of the scalp.
 A: The aponeurosis called epicranial aponeurosis (or galea aponeurotica) is the next layer. It is a tough layer of dense fibrous tissue which runs from the frontalis muscle anteriorly to the occipitalis posteriorly.
 L: The loose areolar connective tissue layer provides an easy plane of separation between the upper three layers and the pericranium. In scalping the scalp is torn off through this layer. It also provides a plane of access in craniofacial surgery and neurosurgery. This layer is sometimes referred to as the "danger zone" because of the ease by which infectious agents can spread through it to emissary veins which then drain into the cranium. The loose areolar tissue in this layer is made up of random collagen I bundles, collagen III. It will also be rich in glycosaminoglycans (GAGs) and will be constituted of more matrix than fibers. This layer allows the more superficial layers of the scalp to shift about in relation to the pericranium.
 P: The pericranium is the periosteum of the skull bones and provides nutrition to the bone and the capacity for repair. It may be lifted from the bone to allow removal of bone windows (craniotomy).

The clinically important layer is the aponeurosis. Scalp lacerations through this layer mean that the "anchoring" of the superficial layers is lost and gaping of the wound occurs which would require suturing. This can be achieved with simple or vertical mattress sutures using a non-absorbable material, which are subsequently removed at around days 7–10.

Blood supply
The blood supply of the scalp is via five pairs of arteries, three from the external carotid and two from the internal carotid:
 internal carotid
 the supratrochlear artery to the midline forehead. The supratrochlear artery is a branch of the ophthalmic branch of the internal carotid artery.
 the supraorbital artery to the lateral forehead and scalp as far up as the vertex. The supraorbital artery is a branch of the ophthalmic branch of the internal carotid artery.
 external carotid
 the superficial temporal artery gives off frontal and parietal branches to supply much of the scalp
 the occipital artery which runs posteriorly to supply much of the posterior aspect of the scalp
 the posterior auricular artery, a branch of the external carotid artery, ascends behind the auricle to supply the scalp above and behind the auricle.
Because the walls of the blood vessels are firmly attached to the fibrous tissue of the superficial fascial layer, cut ends of vessels here do not readily retract; even a small scalp wound may bleed profusely.

Venous drainage

The veins of the scalp accompany the arteries and thus have similar names, e.g. Supratrochlear and supraorbital veins, which unite at the medial angle of the eye, and form the angular vein, which further continues as the facial vein.

The superficial temporal vein descends in front of the tragus, enters the parotid gland, and then joins the maxillary vein to form the retromandibular vein. The anterior part of it unites with the facial vein to form the common facial vein, which drains into jugular vein, and ultimately to the subclavian vein. The occipital vein terminates to the sub-occipital plexus.

There are other veins, like the emissary vein and frontal diploic vein, which also contribute to the venous drainage.

Nerve supply
Innervation is the connection of nerves to the scalp: the sensory and motor nerves innervating the scalp. The scalp is innervated by the following:
 Supratrochlear nerve and the supraorbital nerve from the ophthalmic division of the trigeminal nerve
 Greater occipital nerve (C2) posteriorly up to the vertex
 Lesser occipital nerve (C2) behind the ear
 Zygomaticotemporal nerve from the maxillary division of the trigeminal nerve supplying the hairless temple
 Auriculotemporal nerve from the mandibular division of the trigeminal nerve

The innervation of scalp can be remembered using the mnemonic "Z-GLASS" for Zygomaticotemporal nerve, Greater occipital nerve, Lesser occipital nerve, Auriculotemporal nerve, Supratrochlear nerve, and Supraorbital nerve.

the motor innervation of the scalp, specifically, the Occipitofrontalis which is split into two main factions, the frontal belly or Frontalis muscle is supplied by the temporal branch of facial nerve and the occipital belly or Occipitalis is supplied by the posterior auricular branch of facial nerve.

Lymphatic drainage
Lymphatic channels from the posterior half of the scalp drain to occipital and posterior auricular nodes. Lymphatic channels from the anterior half drain to the parotid nodes. The lymph eventually reaches the submandibular and deep cervical nodes.

Clinical significance

Infection
The 'danger area of the scalp' is the area of loose connective tissue. This is because pus and blood spread easily within it, and can pass into the cranial cavity along the emissary veins. Therefore, infection can spread from the scalp to the meninges, which could lead to meningitis.

Hair transplantation
All the current hair transplantation techniques utilize the patient's existing hair. The aim of the surgical procedure is to use such hair as efficiently as possible. The right candidates for this type of surgery are individuals who still have healthy hair on the sides and the back of the head in order that hair for the transplant may be harvested from those areas. Different techniques are utilized in order to obtain the desired cosmetic results; factors considered may include hair color, texture, curliness, etc.

The most utilized technique is the one known as micro grafting because it produces naturalistic results. It is akin to follicular unit extraction, although less advanced. A knife with multiple blades is used to remove tissue from donor areas. The removed tissue is then fragmented into smaller chunks under direct vision inspection (i.e., without a microscope).

Disease
The scalp is a common site for the development of tumours including:
 Actinic keratosis
 Basal-cell carcinoma
 Epidermoid cyst
 Merkel-cell carcinoma
 Pilar cyst
 Squamous cell carcinoma

Scalp conditions
 Cutis verticis gyrata – a descriptive term for a rare deformity of the scalp
 Dandruff – A common problem caused by excessive shedding of dead skin cells from the scalp
 Head lice
 Seborrhoeic dermatitis – a skin disorder causing scaly, flaky, itchy, red skin
 Cradle cap – a form of seborrhoeic dermatitis which occurs in newborns
 Tycoon's cap, also known as acne necrotica miliaris, characterized by pustules and itching

Society and culture
The scalp plays an important role in the aesthetics of the face. Androgenic alopecia, or male pattern hair loss, is a common cause of concern to men. It may be treated with varying rates success by medication (e.g. finasteride, minoxidil) or hair transplantation. If the scalp is heavy and loose, a common change with ageing, the forehead may be low, heavy and deeply lined. The brow lift procedure aims to address these concerns.

Scalping, the act of removing the scalp, is historically associated with the American West and the Indian Wars in particular, although the practice dates back to antiquity and has developed on each continent.

See also
 Excoriation disorder – obsessive skin picking
 Scalping – the act of removing the scalp, usually with the hair, as a portable proof or trophy of prowess in war
 Trichodynia – burning scalp syndrome
 Trichology – the scientific study of hair and scalp
 Trichotillomania – obsessive hair pulling

References

External links

  - "Integument: scalp, transverse"
  - "Integument: scalp"
 
 http://www.dartmouth.edu/~humananatomy/figures/chapter_47/47-1.HTM

 
Medical mnemonics